Aldo Montano (23 November 1910 – 2 September 1996) was an Italian fencer. He won a silver medal in the team sabre event at the 1936 and 1948 Summer Olympics. His son, Mario Aldo Montano, and grandson Aldo Montano, also competed at the Olympic Games for Italy as fencers.

See also
 Italy national fencing team - Multiple medallist

References

External links
 
 

1910 births
1996 deaths
Italian male fencers
Olympic fencers of Italy
Fencers at the 1936 Summer Olympics
Fencers at the 1948 Summer Olympics
Olympic silver medalists for Italy
Olympic medalists in fencing
Sportspeople from Livorno
Medalists at the 1936 Summer Olympics
Medalists at the 1948 Summer Olympics
20th-century Italian people